The Multan Sultans is a franchise cricket team that will represent Multan in the Pakistan Super League. They are the sixth team to join the league. 2018 was their inaugural season.  After the league was started in 2016, this was the first expansion of the league. Tom Moody serves as their coach. They finished as the fifth placed team after the league stage ended and failed to qualify for the playoffs.

Squad
Players with international caps are shown in bold
Ages are given as of the first match of the season, 22 February 2018

References

2018 in Punjab, Pakistan
2018 Pakistan Super League
Sultans in 2018
2018